John Bruce-Gardyne, Baron Bruce-Gardyne (12 April 1930 – 15 April 1990), was a British Conservative Party politician.

Son of Captain Evan Bruce-Gardyne, DSO, RN, 13th Laird of Middleton, and a member of a Scottish landholding family who have been based in the county of Angus since at least 1008 AD, he was born in Chertsey, Surrey. Bruce-Gardyne was educated at Twyford School, Winchester College and Magdalen College, Oxford, and then served for six years in Foreign Service before becoming a journalist. He was a council member of the Bow Group.

At the 1964 general election, he was elected as the Member of Parliament for South Angus where the family seats of Gardyne Castle, Finavon Castle and Middleton all stood. He held the seat until the October 1974 general election, when he lost to Andrew Welsh of the Scottish National Party. Bruce-Gardyne was later elected as the MP for Knutsford at a by-election in 1979, but was effectively forced out of the House of Commons when the seat was abolished by boundary changes for the 1983 general election. He was a monetarist and was opposed to the Falklands War and was an independent-minded MP. His well-known publication, Meriden: Odyssey Of A Lame Duck, virulently attacked Tony Benn's creation of the Meriden Workers' Co-operative to continue production of Triumph Motorcycles. He was succeeded in the new Tatton seat by Neil Hamilton. He was created a life peer as Baron Bruce-Gardyne, of Kirkden in the District of Angus, on 7 October 1983.

He married Sally Louisa Mary Maitland, daughter of Commander Sir John Maitland, in 1959. He died of a brain tumour in Kensington and Chelsea at the age of sixty.

Footnotes

References
 
Times Guide to the House of Commons, 1966, 1979 and 1983 editions

1930 births
1990 deaths
Conservative Party (UK) life peers
People educated at Winchester College
People from Angus, Scotland
Alumni of Magdalen College, Oxford
Members of the Parliament of the United Kingdom for Scottish constituencies
Conservative Party (UK) MPs for English constituencies
Members of the Bow Group
UK MPs 1964–1966
UK MPs 1966–1970
UK MPs 1970–1974
UK MPs 1974
UK MPs 1974–1979
UK MPs 1979–1983
People from Chertsey
People educated at Twyford School
Scottish Conservative Party MPs
Unionist Party (Scotland) MPs
Life peers created by Elizabeth II